The Moscow Narodny Bank was set up in London in 1915 as a branch of the Russian Moscow Narodny Bank.

In 1916 the London branch was transformed into a full-scale affiliate.

On October 18, 1919 it was transformed into an independent bank Moscow Narodny Bank Limited.

Banks of the Soviet Union
Soviet Union–United Kingdom relations